The Finnish Comics Society was founded in 1971. It is the umbrella organization for the cartoon industry in Finland. Its purpose is to increase the appreciation for comics, to promote the knowledge of good comics and increase comics critical reading. The Finnish Comics Society supports comic artists and collaborates with the Finnish cartoonists association.

The most visible parts of the operation are the annual Helsinki Comics Festival, Sarjainfo magazine, Puupäähattu Prize, Comics Center in Helsinki and the Finnish Comics Annual anthology. They also run multiple Finnish online services around comics like kvaak.fi, sarjakuvablogit.com and 24tuntiasarjakuvaa.info. Finnish Comics Society has also a collection of a variety of comics which can be borrowed with permission.

References

Comics-related organizations
Finnish comics
Arts organisations based in Finland
1971 establishments in Finland
Organizations established in 1971